Steppin' Out with the Grateful Dead: England '72 is a live box set from the Grateful Dead that collects performances from seven of their eight shows in England during their spring 1972 tour of Europe (their first tour of the UK and continental Europe).

The band visited England three times on the tour. They had booked four concerts in London (condensed to two) and one for Newcastle before touring mainland Europe. After the tour began, an opportunity came to return to England to play the stormy Bickershaw Festival, in between dates in Paris and Amsterdam. To make up for the poor sound and crowded shows at the last-minute replacement venue, the Empire Pool, they added more dates at the end of the tour, returning again to London for four performances at the acoustically favorable Lyceum Theatre in the West End.

Track listing

Disc one
 "Cold Rain & Snow" (traditional, arranged by Grateful Dead) – 6:02
 "Greatest Story Ever Told" (Bob Weir, Mickey Hart, Robert Hunter) – 6:00
 "Mr. Charlie" (Ron McKernan, Hunter) – 3:52
 "Sugaree" (Jerry Garcia, Hunter) – 7:34
 "Mexicali Blues" (Weir, John Perry Barlow) – 4:10
 "Big Boss Man" (Al Smith, Luther Dixon) – 6:28
 "Deal" (Garcia, Hunter) – 5:51
 "Jack Straw" (Weir, Hunter) – 5:19
 "Big Railroad Blues" (Noah Lewis) – 4:26
 "It Hurts Me Too" (Elmore James) – 6:07
 "China Cat Sunflower" (Garcia, Hunter) – 5:05 →
 "I Know You Rider" (traditional, arranged by Grateful Dead) – 6:02
 "Happy Birthday to You" (Patty Hill, Mildred J. Hill) – 1:48
 "Playing in the Band" (Weir, Hart, Hunter) – 10:10

Disc two

 "Good Lovin" (Rudy Clark, Artie Resnick) – 20:31
 "Ramble on Rose" (Garcia, Hunter) – 6:41
 "Black-Throated Wind" (Weir, Barlow) – 6:07
 "Sitting on Top of the World" (Walter Jacobs, Lonnie Carter) – 3:30
 "Comes a Time" (Garcia, Hunter) – 7:01
 "Turn on Your Love Light" (Deadric Malone, Joseph Scott) – 13:02 →
 "Goin' Down the Road Feeling Bad" (traditional, arranged by Grateful Dead) – 8:22 →
 "Not Fade Away" (Charles Hardin, Norman Petty) – 4:54 →
 "Hey! Bo Diddley" (Bo Diddley) – 4:30 →
 "Not Fade Away" (Hardin, Petty) – 3:06

Disc three

 "Rockin' Pneumonia and the Boogie Woogie Flu" (Huey Smith) – 5:15
 "Black Peter" (Garcia, Hunter) – 8:52
 "Chinatown Shuffle" (McKernan) – 3:23
 "Truckin" (Garcia, Phil Lesh, Weir, Hunter) – 10:14 →
 "Drums" (Bill Kreutzmann) – 2:44 →
 "The Other One" (Weir, Kreutzmann) – 19:31 →
 "El Paso" (Marty Robbins) – 4:47 →
 "The Other One" (Weir, Kreutzmann) – 8:20 →
 "Wharf Rat" (Garcia, Hunter) – 10:48
 "One More Saturday Night" (Weir) – 4:57

Disc four

 "Uncle John's Band" (Garcia, Hunter) – 7:20
 "The Stranger (Two Souls in Communion)" (McKernan) – 7:57
 "Dark Star" (Garcia, Hart, Kreutzmann, Lesh, McKernan, Weir, Hunter) – 31:27 →
 "Sugar Magnolia" (Weir, Hunter) – 7:15 →
 "Caution (Do Not Stop on Tracks)" (Garcia, Kreutzmann, Lesh, McKernan, Weir) – 17:15
 "Brokedown Palace" (Garcia, Hunter) – 7:02

Notes:

"Jack Straw" also released on Weir Here
"Happy Birthday to You" layed in celebration of Bill Kreutzmann's 26th birthday
An excerpt of "Dark Star" was previously released on Glastonbury Fayre as "Dark Star... bury"
"Caution (Do Not Stop on Tracks)" appears in an edited form

Personnel

Grateful Dead
Jerry Garcia – lead guitar, vocals
Bob Weir – rhythm guitar, vocals
Ron "Pigpen" McKernan – organ, harmonica, vocals
Phil Lesh – bass guitar, vocals
Bill Kreutzmann – drums
Keith Godchaux – piano
Donna Jean Godchaux – vocals

Production

David Lemieux – compilation producer
Jeffrey Norman – mixing
Bob Matthews – recording
Betty Cantor – recording
Dennis Leonard – recording
Jim Furman – recording
Cassidy Law – project coordination
Dick Latvala – tape archivist
Eileen Law – archival research
Rudson Shurtliff – assistant engineer
Mary Ann Mayer – photography
Richard Biffle – cover art
Robert Minkin – layout design
Heard – crew
Jackson – crew
Kidd – crew
Parrish – crew
Ramrod – crew
Raizene, Winslow – crew
Barry – crew
Blair Jackson – liner notes
Sam Cutler – onstage band introduction

Charts
Album - Billboard

References

Grateful Dead live albums
Grateful Dead compilation albums
2002 live albums
2002 compilation albums
Arista Records live albums
Arista Records compilation albums